In axiomatic set theory, the axiom of union is one of the axioms of Zermelo–Fraenkel set theory. This axiom was introduced by Ernst Zermelo.

The axiom states that for each set x there is a set y whose elements are precisely the elements of the elements of x.

Formal statement 
In the formal language of the Zermelo–Fraenkel axioms, the axiom reads:

or in words:
Given any set A, there is a set B such that, for any element c, c is a member of B if and only if there is a set D such that c is a member of D and D is a member of A.
or, more simply:
For any set , there is a set  which consists of just the elements of the elements of that set .

Relation to Pairing 
The axiom of union allows one to unpack a set of sets and thus create a flatter set. 
Together with the axiom of pairing, this implies that for any two sets, there is a set (called their union) that contains exactly the elements of the two sets.

Relation to Replacement 
The axiom of replacement allows one to form many unions, such as the union of two sets.

However, in its full generality, the axiom of union is independent from the rest of the ZFC-axioms: 
Replacement does not prove the existence of the union of a set of sets if the result contains an unbounded number of cardinalities.

Together with the axiom schema of replacement, the axiom of union implies that one can form the union of a family of sets indexed by a set.

Relation to Separation 
In the context of set theories which include the axiom of separation, the axiom of union is sometimes stated in a weaker form which only produces a superset of the union of a set. For example, Kunen states the axiom as 
 
which is equivalent to
 
Compared to the axiom stated at the top of this section, this variation asserts only one direction of the implication, rather than both directions.

Relation to Intersection 
There is no corresponding axiom of intersection. If  is a nonempty set containing , it is possible to form the intersection  using the axiom schema of specification as
,
so no separate axiom of intersection is necessary. (If A is the empty set, then trying to form the intersection of A as
{c: for all D in A, c is in D}
is not permitted by the axioms. Moreover, if such a set existed, then it would contain every set in the "universe", but the notion of a universal set is antithetical to Zermelo–Fraenkel set theory.)

References 
{{reflist|refs=
<ref name=Zermelo1908>Ernst Zermelo, 1908, "Untersuchungen über die Grundlagen der Mengenlehre I", Mathematische Annalen 65(2), pp. 261–281.English translation: Jean van Heijenoort, 1967, From Frege to Gödel: A Source Book in Mathematical Logic, pp. 199–215 </ref>

}}

Further reading
Paul Halmos, Naive set theory. Princeton, NJ: D. Van Nostrand Company, 1960. Reprinted by Springer-Verlag, New York, 1974.  (Springer-Verlag edition).
Jech, Thomas, 2003. Set Theory: The Third Millennium Edition, Revised and Expanded''.  Springer.  .

Axioms of set theory

de:Zermelo-Fraenkel-Mengenlehre#Die Axiome von ZF und ZFC